Pennsylvania held statewide elections on November 3, 2015, to fill judicial positions (including three seats on the Supreme Court), fill a vacancy in the Pennsylvania State Senate, allow judicial retention votes, and fill numerous county, local and municipal offices. The necessary primary elections were held on May 19, 2015.

Justice of the Supreme Court

There were three vacancies to fill on the Pennsylvania Supreme Court, created by the departures of Joan Orie Melvin in 2013, Seamus McCaffery in 2014 and Ronald D. Castille in 2014.

Democratic primary

Candidates

Declared
Christine Donohue, Pennsylvania Superior Court judge
Kevin Dougherty, Philadelphia County Common Pleas Court judge
John H. Foradora, Jefferson County Court judge
Anne E. Lazarus, Pennsylvania Superior Court judge
David Wecht, Pennsylvania Superior Court judge
Dwayne Woodruff, Allegheny County Common Pleas Court judge

Results

Republican primary

Candidates

Declared
Cheryl Allen, Pennsylvania Superior Court judge
Ann Covey, Pennsylvania Commonwealth Court judge
Michael George, Adams County Common Pleas Court judge
Judith Olson, Pennsylvania Superior Court judge
Correale Stevens, incumbent Associate Justice
Rebecca L. Warren, Montour County district attorney

Results

General election

Judge of the Superior Court
There was one vacancy to fill on the Pennsylvania Superior Court.

Democratic primary

Candidates

Declared
Robert J. Colville, Allegheny County Common Pleas Court judge
Alice D. Dubow, Philadelphia Common Pleas Court judge

Results

Republican primary

Candidates

Declared
Emil Giordano, Northampton County Common Pleas Court judge

Results

General election

Results

Judge of the Commonwealth Court
There was one vacancy to fill on the Pennsylvania Commonwealth Court.

Democratic primary

Candidates

Declared
Todd Eagen, grandson of former Chief Justice of the Pennsylvania Supreme Court Michael J. Eagen
Michael Woljcik, former Allegheny County solicitor

Results

Republican primary

Candidates

Declared
Paul Lalley, senior associate attorney at Campbell, Durant, Beatty, Palombo & Miller, Lalley firm

Results

General election

Results

37th Senatorial District Special Election
There was one vacancy to fill in the Pennsylvania State Senate, in the 37th district, created by the resignation of Matthew H. Smith.

See also
Philadelphia mayoral election, 2015

References

 
Pennsylvania judicial elections
Pennsylvania special elections